Porcino may refer to:
 Boletus edulis, an edible mushroom
 Al Porcino (1925–2013), American jazz trumpeter